Agofe is the noble title for the chief cultural leader among all the Lugbara people or King of Lado Kingdom which covers the regions of West Nile, Ituri, Torit, Uele and Yei. The term means 'Pillar' or 'Paramount Chief' but a king is also called opi in Lugbara; an opi is usually the clan leader of a lineage. Around 1967, President Milton Obote abolished kingdoms, then the 1995 Constitution reinstated cultural institutions but the Lugbara only chose county chiefs. In 2012, the Government of Uganda finally recognised this revised Agofe institution. The Agofe's duty will be to preserve Lugbara culture through literature and other assignments.

Authority
In the past, the Lugbara only had their respective clan chiefs. So, some people opposed this development. However, under the constitution of this modern cultural institution, leadership will be democratic like an elective monarchy in rotational series of five years amongst the six Lugbara counties in Uganda including Aringa, Ayivu, Madi, Maracha, Terego and Vurra plus those in DR Congo and the diaspora. Although a territory for Kakwa people, Koboko is also included because pupils are taught in Lugbara there. A king (Agofe) who has already served one term can be eligible for re-election depending on his performance. Also, a ruling Agofe can be replaced depending on his character and other failings.

Jason Avutia is the third (and current) Agofe of Lugbara Kari though election of his replacement is planned for 2021. He resides in (Mvara Parish of) Arua Town, the cultural headquarters, where he has headed the Association of Arua District Elders for two decades. Many people knew him as the Chairman of LULA (Lugbara Literature Association) but he was also an Education Minister in his younger years.

To qualify as the Agofe, any Lugbara must have a minimum age of 55 years.

See also
 Lugbara language
 Lugbara Kari

References

Lugbara
Ugandan culture